Jimmy Lidberg (born 13 April 1982) is a retired Swedish Greco-Roman wrestler. He is an Olympic bronze medalist and won several World and European Championship medals as well.

Biography
Lidberg grew up in Farsta and on Södermalm in Stockholm and won several titles in wrestling. His older brother Martin Lidberg is also a wrestler. He won his first senior Swedish Championship when he was 17 years old.

He has won three straight European Wrestling Championships medals and three straight World Wrestling Championships medals, while later winning a fourth World Championship medal. Overall, he has won eight consecutive medals from international senior championships. Lidberg was ranked at the top 3 in the world in his weight class in 2007, 2009, and 2012. He won the bronze medal at the 2012 Summer Olympics in the men's Greco-Roman 96 kg category.

In January 2013, he announced that he was retiring from wrestling. As of April 2013 he is head coach of the Norwegian Wrestling Federation. In addition to being a physical trainer and coach, Lidberg also started two companies. He co-founded with two friends the club Huddinge Brottarklubb.

Between 2017 and 2021, Lidberg worked as the fitness coach for football club Hammarby IF in Allsvenskan, Sweden's first tier.

Lidberg's life and career is documented in Bahador Shahidi's documentary film Jimmy the Wrestler (2021) where also Lidberg's brother Martin Lidberg participates.

Lidberg has two children and is the younger brother of fellow wrestler Martin Lidberg.

References

External links
 bio on fila-wrestling.com

1982 births
Living people
Swedish male sport wrestlers
Olympic wrestlers of Sweden
Wrestlers at the 2012 Summer Olympics
Olympic bronze medalists for Sweden
Olympic medalists in wrestling
Medalists at the 2012 Summer Olympics
World Wrestling Championships medalists
Hammarby Fotboll non-playing staff
European Wrestling Championships medalists